Switzerland is a neutral European country, which is not a member of the North Atlantic Treaty Organization (NATO). Since 1996, Switzerland has participated in NATO's Partnership for Peace (PfP) programme. Switzerland is surrounded by the European Union but not an EU member itself, thereby also maintaining its neutrality with regard to EU membership and the EU mutual defence clause enshrined in Article 42.7 of the consolidated version of the Treaty on European Union, although the EU treaty also provides for neutral countries to maintain their neutrality.

Background

Historical neutrality

Neutrality is one of the main principles of Switzerland's foreign policy which dictates that Switzerland is not to be involved in armed or political conflicts between other states. This policy is self-imposed and designed to ensure external security and promote peace.

Switzerland has the oldest policy of military neutrality in the world; it has not participated in a foreign war since its neutrality was established by the Treaty of Paris in 1815.

Although the European powers (Austria, France, the United Kingdom, Portugal, Prussia, Russia, Spain and Sweden) agreed at the Congress of Vienna in May 1815 that Switzerland should be neutral, final ratification was delayed until after Napoleon Bonaparte was defeated so that some coalition forces could invade France via Swiss territory.

The country has a history of armed neutrality going back to the Reformation; it has not been in a state of war internationally since 1815 and did not join the United Nations until 2002. It pursues an active foreign policy and is frequently involved in peace-building processes around the world.

According to Swiss president Ignazio Cassis in 2022 during a World Economic Forum speech, the laws of neutrality for  
Switzerland are based on The Hague agreement principles which include “no participation in wars; international cooperation but no membership in any military alliance; no provision of troops or weapons to warring parties and no granting of transition rights.”

Relationship with the European Union

Switzerland applied to join the European Union (EU) in 1992, however the application was however withdrawn due to public opposition. A referendum to join] the European Economic Area was rejected in 1992.

Switzerland is at present associated with the EU through a series of bilateral treaties in which Switzerland has adopted various provisions of European Union law in order to participate in the Union's single market, without joining as a member state. All but one (the microstate Liechtenstein) of Switzerland's neighbouring countries are EU member states.

Russian invasion of Ukraine
Following the 2022 Russian invasion of Ukraine, Switzerland adopted sanctions imposed by the European Union against Russia in response to the Russian invasion of Ukraine. While Switzerland follows defined rules to remain neutral in military conflicts, it imposed sanctions for this "serious violation of the most fundamental norms of international law [...] within the scope of its political room for manoeuvre." Swiss law only allows for adoption of sanctions imposed by the United Nations Security Council, the EU or the OECD. Irrespective of the actual laws governing a neutral country, many media outlets still labelled this as a break with 500 years of Swiss neutrality.

In April 2022, the Federal Department of Economic Affairs vetoed Germany's request to re-export Swiss ammunition to Ukraine on the basis of Swiss neutrality.  The defence ministry of Switzerland, initiated a report in May 2022 analyzing various military options, including increased cooperation and joint military exercises with NATO.

Opinion polling on Swiss NATO membership

In May 2022, another poll indicated 33% of Swiss supported NATO membership for Switzerland, and 56% supported increased ties with NATO.

References

See also
Foreign relations of Switzerland
Swiss neutrality
 Foreign relations of NATO 
 Enlargement of NATO 
 NATO open door policy
 Partnership for Peace

Foreign relations of Switzerland
NATO relations